Pronevskaya is a rural locality (a village) in Tarnogskoye Rural Settlement, Tarnogsky District, Vologda Oblast, Russia. The population was 67 as of 2002.

Geography 
Pronevskaya is located 17 km northwest of Tarnogsky Gorodok (the district's administrative centre) by road. Afanasyevskaya is the nearest rural locality.

References 

Rural localities in Tarnogsky District